Nowdar or Now Dar or Nuder may refer to:
 Now Dar, Khuzestan
 Nowdar, South Khorasan